Princess Fawzia (7 April 1940 – 27 January 2005) was the second daughter of King Farouk I of Egypt from his first wife Queen Farida.

Early life and education

Fawzia was born on 7 April 1940 in Abdeen Palace in Cairo. She was named after her paternal aunt, who was reportedly King Farouk's favourite sister. She was 12 years old when the July 1952 Revolution forced her father's abdication and departure from Egypt. Along with her two sisters, she travelled with King Farouk on his last voyage out of Egypt, and lived with him in exile in Rome. Two years later, the three young princesses were sent to a Swiss boarding school by the king. Their mother Queen Farida stayed in Egypt, and joined her daughters in Switzerland only a decade after the revolution.

Fawzia was an accomplished athlete. She took flying lessons and obtained a pilot's licence. A professional sailor, she managed to reach the rank of captain, and was also a passionate scuba diver. She was multilingual in French, English, Italian, Spanish and Arabic, and passed an exam which qualified her to work as a simultaneous interpreter in Switzerland. She had not inherited a significant sum and relied on her interpreting job to earn a living. Although she had lost her royal status, Fawzia remained strongly attached to her homeland, and visited Egypt as often as she could. Unlike her two sisters she never married.

Illness and death
In 1995, Fawzia was diagnosed with multiple sclerosis, which left her paralysed and bedridden. She died in Lausanne on 27 January 2005 at the age of 64. Her body was flown to Cairo where she was buried at Al-Rifa'i Mosque, as traditional for members of the Egyptian royal family, on 30 January.

Ancestors

References

Egyptian princesses
Farouk of Egypt
1940 births
2005 deaths
Egyptian sailors
Interpreters
Muhammad Ali dynasty
Sea captains
Royalty from Cairo
Deaths from multiple sclerosis
Neurological disease deaths in Switzerland
Royalty and nobility with disabilities
Egyptian people of Albanian descent
Egyptian people of Circassian descent
Egyptian people of French descent
Egyptian people of Turkish descent
Egyptian emigrants to Switzerland